Montel-de-Gelat is a commune in the Puy-de-Dôme department in Auvergne in central France.

See also
Communes of the Puy-de-Dôme department
 Saint Eloy's mines

References

Monteldegelat